Baroque painting is the painting associated with the Baroque cultural movement. The movement is often identified with Absolutism, the Counter Reformation and Catholic Revival, but the existence of important Baroque art and architecture in non-absolutist and Protestant states throughout Western Europe underscores its widespread popularity.

Baroque painting encompasses a great range of styles, as most important and major painting during the period beginning around 1600 and continuing throughout the 17th century, and into the early 18th century is identified today as Baroque painting. In its most typical manifestations, Baroque art is characterized by great drama, rich, deep colour, and intense light and dark shadows, but the classicism of French Baroque painters like Poussin and Dutch genre painters such as Vermeer are also covered by the term, at least in English. As opposed to Renaissance art, which usually showed the moment before an event took place, Baroque artists chose the most dramatic point, the moment when the action was occurring: Michelangelo, working in the High Renaissance, shows his David composed and still before he battles Goliath; Bernini's Baroque David is caught in the act of hurling the stone at the giant. Baroque art was meant to evoke emotion and passion instead of the calm rationality that had been prized during the Renaissance.

Among the greatest painters of the Baroque period are Velázquez, Caravaggio, Rembrandt, Rubens, Poussin, and Vermeer. Caravaggio is an heir of the humanist painting of the High Renaissance. His realistic approach to the human figure, painted directly from life and dramatically spotlit against a dark background, shocked his contemporaries and opened a new chapter in the history of painting.  Baroque painting often dramatizes scenes using chiaroscuro light effects; this can be seen in works by Rembrandt, Vermeer, Le Nain and La Tour.
The Flemish painter Anthony van Dyck developed a graceful but imposing portrait style that was very influential, especially in England.

The prosperity of 17th century Holland led to an enormous production of art by large numbers of painters who were mostly highly specialized and painted only genre scenes, landscapes, still lifes, portraits or history paintings.  Technical standards were very high, and Dutch Golden Age painting established a new repertoire of subjects that was very influential until the arrival of Modernism.

History 

The Council of Trent (1545–63), in which the Roman Catholic Church answered many questions of internal reform raised by both Protestants and by those who had remained inside the Catholic Church, addressed the representational arts in a short and somewhat oblique passage in its decrees.  This was subsequently interpreted and expounded by a number of clerical authors like Molanus, who demanded that paintings and sculptures in church contexts should depict their subjects clearly and powerfully, and with decorum, without the stylistic airs of Mannerism.
This return toward a populist conception of the function of ecclesiastical art is seen by many art historians as driving the innovations of Caravaggio and the Carracci brothers, all of whom were working (and competing for commissions) in Rome around 1600, although unlike the Carracci, Caravaggio persistently was criticised for lack of decorum in his work.
However, although religious painting, history painting, allegories, and portraits were still considered the most noble subjects, landscape, still life, and genre scenes were also becoming more common in Catholic countries, and were the main genres in Protestant ones.

The term
The term "Baroque" was initially used with a derogatory meaning, to underline the excesses of its emphasis. Others derive it from the mnemonic term "Baroco" denoting, in logical Scholastica, a supposedly laboured form of syllogism.
In particular, the term was used to describe its eccentric redundancy and noisy abundance of details, which sharply contrasted the clear and sober rationality of the Renaissance.  It was first rehabilitated by the Swiss-born art historian, Heinrich Wölfflin (1864–1945) in his Renaissance und Barock (1888); Wölfflin identified the Baroque as "movement imported into mass", an art antithetic to Renaissance art. He did not make the distinctions between Mannerism and Baroque that modern writers do, and he ignored the later phase, the academic Baroque that lasted into the 18th century. Writers in French and English did not begin to treat Baroque as a respectable study until Wölfflin's influence had made German scholarship pre-eminent.

National variations
Led by Italy, Mediterranean countries, slowly followed by most of the Holy Roman Empire in Germany and Central Europe, generally adopted a full-blooded Baroque approach.

A rather different art developed out of northern realist traditions in 17th century Dutch Golden Age painting, which had very little religious art, and little history painting, instead playing a crucial part in developing secular genres such as still life, genre paintings of everyday scenes, and landscape painting.  While the Baroque nature of Rembrandt's art is clear, the label is less used for Vermeer and many other Dutch artists.  Most Dutch art lacks the idealization and love of splendour typical of much Baroque work, including the neighbouring Flemish Baroque painting which shared a part in Dutch trends, while also continuing to produce the traditional categories in a more clearly Baroque style.

In France a dignified and graceful classicism gave a distinctive flavour to Baroque painting, where the later 17th century is also regarded as a golden age for painting.  Two of the most important artists, Nicolas Poussin and Claude Lorrain, remained based in Rome, where their work, almost all in easel paintings, was much appreciated by Italian as well as French patrons.

Baroque painters

British
William Dobson (1611–1646)
George Jamesone (1587–1644)
Godfrey Kneller (1646–1723)
Peter Lely (1618–1680)
Daniël Mijtens (1590–1648)
John Michael Wright (1617–1694)

Dutch

Czech (Bohemian)
Václav Hollar (1607–1677)
Karel Škréta (1610–1674)
Petr Brandl (1668–1735)
Václav Vavřinec Reiner (1686–1743)

Flemish

French

German
Cosmas Damian Asam (1686–1739)
Adam Elsheimer (1578–1610)
Johann Liss (1590–1627)
Sebastian Stoskopff (1597–1657)

Hungarian
Ádám Mányoki (1673–1757)

Italian

Polish

Portuguese

Spanish

Gallery

See also
Baroque illusionistic painting
History of painting
Western painting
Rococo Painting

References

Reading
 
 
 Mark Getlein, Living With Art, 8th edition.
Gombrich, E.H., The Story of Art, Phaidon, 1995. 
Christine Buci-Glucksmann, Baroque Reason: The Aesthetics of Modernity, Sage, 1994
Michael Kitson, 1966. The Age of Baroque'
Heinrich Wölfflin, 1964. Renaissance and Baroque'' (Reprinted 1984; originally published in German, 1888) The classic study. 

 
Art history